Samuel Shethar Phelps (May 13, 1793March 25, 1855) was an American lawyer and politician. He was a United States senator from Vermont, and a member of the Whig Party.

Biography
Phelps was born in Litchfield, Connecticut, to John Phelps (1756–1833), an American Revolutionary War soldier and great-great-grandson of William Phelps. Samuel S. Phelps graduated from Yale University in 1811. He studied law at Litchfield Law School and in the office of Horatio Seymour, and was admitted to the bar. He served as a military paymaster during the War of 1812. Following the war, he settled in Middlebury, Vermont and began the practice of law.

Phelps began his political career serving in the Vermont State House from 1821 to 1832. He was a judge on the Vermont Supreme Court from 1832 to 1838, succeeding to the position left vacant by the death of John C. Thompson. In 1839 he was elected as a Whig to the United States Senate, and he served until 1851. He chaired several committees while serving in the Senate, including the Committee on the Militia, Committee on Revolutionary Claims, Committee on Pensions, Committee on Patents and the Patent Office and the Committee on Territories.

Phelps returned to the United States Senate on January 17, 1853, having been appointed to fill the unexpired term of Senator William Upham, who had died. He served until March 16, 1854 when the Senate resolved that he was not entitled to the seat on the grounds that he had been legally appointed by the Governor of Vermont when the Vermont General Assembly was not in session, but once the legislature was in session, it was incumbent on legislators to choose a successor.

Family life
Phelps was married to Frances Shurtleff Phelps and they had three children together, Edward John Phelps, James Shether Phelps and Charles Henry Phelps. Phelps later married Electa Satterlee Phelps. Phelps' son Edward John Phelps was also a politician and lawyer, as well as a diplomat.

Death
Phelps died on March 25, 1855 in Middlebury, and is interred at West Cemetery in Middlebury.

Published works
"Mr. Phelps’ Appeal to the People of Vermont" by Samuel S. Phelps, published in the American Whig Review 12 (July 1850): 93-98, Middlebury, VT, 1846.
"Mr. Phelps' Rejoinder to Mr. Slade's "Reply."", printed by J. & G.S. Gideon, Washington, D.C., no date, but ca 1846.

References

Further reading
"Vermont Supreme Court Justices: Wheelock G. Veazey, Samuel S. Phelps, Hiland Hall, Henry R. Start, James Stuart Holden, Harrie B. Chase" published by General Books, 2010.

External links
Biographical Directory of the United States Congress

govtrack.us
The Political Graveyard
Phelps Family History in America
A Walking History of Middlebury

1793 births
1855 deaths
Politicians from Litchfield, Connecticut
American people of English descent
Whig Party United States senators from Vermont
Vermont Whigs
Members of the Vermont House of Representatives
Justices of the Vermont Supreme Court
People from Middlebury, Vermont
Vermont lawyers
Yale University alumni
Litchfield Law School alumni
United States Army personnel of the War of 1812
United States Army paymasters
Burials in Vermont
19th-century American judges
19th-century American lawyers